The  Alte Burg, formerly Hofgut Aull, is a mediaeval water castle in  Aull in the county of Rhein-Lahn-Kreis in the German state of Rhineland-Palatinate.

History 
The origins of the former water castle date to the second half of the 13th century. In 1284 the castle is first mentioned as an estate of the ministerialis Helfenstein family. Nothing remains of this earlier castle.

The present gateway is dated 1558. As a result of further modifications the appearance of the castle changed up until the 18th century.

Site 
The small present-day castle site has Late Gothic architecture and is one of the last examples of Rhenish timber-framed castles. The castle is privately owned and is inhabited.

External links 
 Alte Burg Aull at info.burgdirekt.de
 History of Dorf Aull at aull-lahn.de

Aull
Aull
Rhein-Lahn-Kreis